The Tweed Coast Raiders is an Australian rugby league club. It was formed in 1980 and currently field male and female teams in all junior grades of the Northern Rivers Regional Rugby League and Gold Coast Rugby League. The club is based at Les Burger Fields in Cabarita Beach, New South Wales.

Notable Juniors
Michael Gordon
Karl Lawton (2016- Gold Coast Titans & New Zealand Warriors)

See also

List of rugby league clubs in Australia

References

External links

Rugby league teams in New South Wales
Rugby clubs established in 1980
1980 establishments in Australia
Sport in Tweed Heads, New South Wales